Dichomeris aenigmatica is a moth of the family Gelechiidae. It was first described by John Frederick Gates Clarke in 1962. It is native to Mexico, but has been purposely introduced to Hawaii in 1957 to control sour bush.

The wingspan is about 11 mm. The forewings have a mostly pale fuscous or grayish background. There are two small, variable, cream-colored maculae at the middle of the wing, and there may be a very small cream-colored macula on the fold.

The larvae feed on Pluchea odorata.

External links

aenigmatica
Moths described in 1962